Jason Choi is an international lawn bowler from China (Hong Kong).

Bowls career
Choi was selected as part of the five man team by Hong Kong for the 2016 World Outdoor Bowls Championship, which was held in Avonhead, Christchurch, New Zealand.

He won a fours bronze medal (with Chun Yat Wong, Tony Cheung and Terry Kung), at the 2015 Asia Pacific Bowls Championships, held in Christchurch, New Zealand.

In 2023, Choi reached the semi-finals of the open pairs with Ken Chan at the 2023 World Indoor Bowls Championship. On their way to the semi finals they defeated the world champions Darren Burnett and Stewart Anderson in the quarter finals.

References

Hong Kong male bowls players
Living people
Year of birth missing (living people)